"Pretend We're Dead" is a 1992 song by American all-female rock band L7, from the album Bricks Are Heavy. It was written by Donita Sparks. It was the first single from Bricks Are Heavy and achieved moderate international success. It spent 20 weeks on the Billboard Modern Rock Tracks, peaking at #8. It also reached #21 on the UK Singles Chart and charted in Belgium and Australia.

It has been featured in the video games Grand Theft Auto: San Andreas and Rock Band 2, as well as numerous TV programs and films.

A documentary about L7 directed by Sarah Price and titled L7: Pretend We're Dead was released in 2016. The film covers the band discussing challenges associate with producing the video for "Pretend We're Dead" including a crane failure that injured Suzi Gardner and heavy handed video producers that stifled the creative vision of Sparks.

Conception
Donita Sparks was in her apartment in Echo Park trying to write lyrics to a cassette she had made. She was heartbroken at the time due to a recent breakup, and she says the first thing that came to her was, "I just pretend that you're dead." She did not mean it as wanting her former paramour to be dead but felt that the only way she could get through the breakup was to pretend he was dead. Then, immediately, in her mind, she thought "I'm not writing that. It's just not gonna happen. What about, "pretend we're dead"?" She liked that because playing dead was a children's game, and it also served as a kind of commentary on Reagan/Bush–era apathy.

Sparks stated that there was an unspoken sentiment in the band that love songs were to be avoided.  In an interview regarding the early formation of "Pretend We're Dead" Sparks stated "We chose fierceness and humor over vulnerability because we were, you know, navigating challenging waters — women in hard rock. You had to be tough."

Track listing
 "Pretend We're Dead" (Sparks)
 "Shitlist" (Sparks)
 "Lopsided Head"
 "Mr. Integrity" (Sparks)

Charts

References

External links
 

1992 songs
1992 singles
Song recordings produced by Butch Vig
L7 (band) songs
Songs written by Donita Sparks
Songs with feminist themes
Slash Records singles
Songs against capitalism